Air Commodore Douglas Douglas-Hamilton, 14th Duke of Hamilton and 11th Duke of Brandon,  (3 February 1903 – 30 March 1973) was a Scottish nobleman and aviator who was the first man to fly over Mount Everest.

When German Deputy Führer Rudolf Hess made his surprise landing in Scotland in May 1941, he claimed to know Hamilton, who denied that, although both were believed to have met at the Berlin Olympics and had possibly remained in contact. Hamilton was, however, declared in Parliament to be innocent of any breach of security.

Early life
Hamilton was born in Pimlico, London. He was the son of Alfred Douglas-Hamilton, 13th Duke of Hamilton and his wife Nina (née Poore). He was educated at Eton College and Balliol College, Oxford, where he gained a Blue in boxing, this in turn, led to his winning of the Scottish Amateur Middleweight title. He also represented the university in rowing.

Styled Marquess of Douglas and Clydesdale before he succeeded his father as the Duke of Hamilton and Keeper of Holyroodhouse in 1940, he was a prominent Unionist Member of Parliament (MP) for East Renfrewshire from 1930 until he succeeded to his titles. He was appointed the honorary colonel of the 7th (Blythswood) Battalion of the Highland Light Infantry in July 1931. In 1935, in order to experience the life of the employees in his family's mines, he joined a Trades Union and worked for a time at the coal face, as plain 'Mr. Hamilton'.

Air force career and flight over Everest
He became interested in flying at an early age, and served in the Royal Auxiliary Air Force (RAuxAF). He was commissioned in the 602 (City of Glasgow) Squadron as a pilot officer on 4 July 1927, with subsequent and rapid promotions to flying officer (4 January 1929) and to flight lieutenant (15 January 1930). On 6 May 1931, aged 28, the Marquess became the youngest squadron leader of his day, commanding the squadron from 1931 to 1936.

He was involved in one of the more ambitious aeronautical flights of the early twentieth century, sponsored by Lucy, Lady Houston, the Houston-Mount Everest Flight Expedition. Flying in formation higher than any before; Lord Clydesdale, as he was known, was chief pilot on the first flight over Mount Everest in 1933, flying a Westland PV-3 biplane. The extremity endured by the crews of these aeroplanes helped demonstrate the need for pressurised cabins in modern aircraft. It was also the first detailed and scientific survey of the Himalaya region. Indirectly, the expedition resulted in the formation of Scottish Aviation Ltd (now part of BAE Systems). A documentary film, Wings over Everest, by Ivor Montagu and Geoffrey Barkas, was made of the record-setting flight and won a Hollywood Oscar Award in 1934.

In recognition of his role in the expedition, he was decorated with the Air Force Cross in the 1935 New Year Honours. As a pioneering early aviator, he was regarded in much the same heroic way as the astronauts a generation later.

He relinquished command of his squadron on 2 September 1936, receiving a promotion to wing commander.

Second World War, Hess Affair and aftermath

Hamilton had attended the 1936 Summer Olympics in Berlin. A keen sportsman, he had flown his own plane to Germany where he was a member of a multi-party parliamentary group which had been invited to Berlin to observe the games by the German government.

In Berlin, he attended numerous functions, including a grand dinner for the British contingent hosted by Joachim von Ribbentrop, the German ambassador to Britain and later foreign minister, where he was introduced to Hitler and other leading members of the National Socialist government. Hamilton had previously met Ribbentrop in London as the Ambassador to the Court of St. James's. Hamilton was invited by Hermann Göring to inspect the newly reinstated Luftwaffe, for his professional interest in aviation. He claimed not to have met Deputy Führer Rudolf Hess in Germany, although he attended a dinner party in Berlin that was also attended by Hess. As both were highly competent pilots with an avid interest in aviation, there is speculation as to the reliability of his denial.

In Germany, Hamilton had met the geopolitician Albrecht Haushofer, the son of the distinguished geopolitical academic Karl Haushofer. The younger Haushofer had studied alongside Hess at Munich University. On Hess's rise to prominence within the Nazi Party, Haushofer became his advisor on foreign affairs. There is speculation that Hess communicated with the Duke via Haushofer after the outbreak of war.

In 1940, upon his father's death, Hamilton succeeded to the dukedom. As an RAF officer, he was also responsible for the aerial defence of his sector of Southern Scotland and Northern England and was Mentioned in Dispatches for his war service. At the outbreak of war, he resumed his commission with the honorary rank of air commodore. He was responsible for air defence in Scotland and took command of the Air Training Corps. He was promoted to temporary group captain on 1 June 1941.

Hess affair
On 10 May 1941, Hess parachuted into Scotland; the reason for his doing so was ostensibly to meet with the Duke and to plot a secret peace treaty that would lead to the supremacy of Germany in Continental Europe and the reinforcement of the British Empire elsewhere.

Hess crash-landed at Floors Farm, near Eaglesham, at 10:34 pm and gave his name as "Alfred Horn", a friend of the Duke of Hamilton. Hess however, was taken to hospital for injuries sustained during his descent. Hamilton was informed of the prisoner and visited him. He then revealed his true identity. Hamilton immediately contacted Winston Churchill and informed him of the Deputy Führer's arrival. Hess was imprisoned by the British authorities until the end of the war and the subsequent Nuremberg trials.

Hamilton came under pressure from the press to explain his role in the affair, with suspicions being raised that he might have been in prior contact with Hess. Questions were asked in the House of Commons. On 22 May, Sir Archibald Sinclair, the Secretary of State for Air, gave this statement to the House:

When Deputy Führer Hess came down with his aeroplane in Scotland on 10 May, he gave a false name and asked to see the Duke of Hamilton. The Duke, being apprised by the authorities, visited the German prisoner in hospital. Hess then revealed for the first time his true identity, saying that he had seen the Duke when he was at the Olympic games at Berlin in 1936. The Duke did not recognise the Deputy Führer. He had however, visited Germany for the Olympic games in 1936, and during that time had attended more than one large public function at which German ministers were present. It is, therefore, quite possible that the Deputy Führer may have seen him on one such occasion. As soon as the interview was over, Wing Commander the Duke of Hamilton flew to England and gave a full report of what had passed to the Prime Minister, who sent for him. Contrary to reports which have appeared in some newspapers, the Duke has never been in correspondence with the Deputy Führer. None of the Duke's three brothers, who are, like him, serving in the Royal Air Force has either met Hess or has had correspondence with him. It will be seen that the conduct of the Duke of Hamilton has been in every respect honourable and proper.

Sir Harry Lauder
At the end of February 1950, the Duke led the funeral procession, on foot, through Hamilton for his friend, the entertainer Sir Harry Lauder and read the eulogy describing Lauder as "a Great Scot".

Offices and positions held
As a member of the House of Commons, he was a Privy Counsellor.

He was appointed Lord Steward of the Household in 1940, holding the office until 1964.

He served as Chancellor of the University of St Andrews from 1948 to 1973. He was appointed to the Order of the Thistle on 8 December 1951. He was also a member of the Royal Company of Archers, the Sovereign's bodyguard for Scotland.

He served as Lord High Commissioner to the General Assembly of the Church of Scotland four times, in 1953, 1954, 1955 and 1958.

In 1963 the Duke was made honorary president of the Boys' Brigade; he had been the treasurer since 1938. He was the president of the Air League from 1959 to 1968.

The Duke served as President of the Hamilton Academy FP (former pupils) Rugby Club, 1946–1955.

Business positions held
 Director of Scottish Aviation Ltd
 Deputy governor of the British Linen Bank
 President of Securicor (Scotland) Ltd
 President of the Building Societies Association
 Chairman of Nationwide Building Society (Scotland)
 Chairman of Norwich Union Life and Fire Insurance Society (Scotland)

Publications
The Pilots' book of Everest – with Flight Lieutenant D.F. McIntyre. Hodge, London, 1936.

Marriage and issue
In 1937, he married the Lady Elizabeth Ivy Percy, daughter of Alan Percy, 8th Duke of Northumberland, and had five sons:

 Angus Douglas-Hamilton, 15th Duke of Hamilton (born 13 September 1938, died 5 June 2010); married three times, with issue from the first
 Lord James Alexander Douglas-Hamilton, Baron Selkirk of Douglas (born 31 July 1942); married with issue
 Lord Hugh Malcolm Douglas-Hamilton (born 22 August 1946, died 21 June 1995): married twice, with issue from the first
 Lord Patrick George Douglas-Hamilton (born 2 August 1950); married and has issue
 Lord David Stephen Douglas-Hamilton (born 26 December 1952, died 6 April 2020)

See also
 George Douglas-Hamilton, 10th Earl of Selkirk (1906–1994)
 Lord Malcolm Douglas-Hamilton (1909–1964) 
 Lord David Douglas-Hamilton (1912–1944)

References

Notes
Bibliography
 Who's Who 1973. A. & C. Black, London, 1973.

External links
 
 Portrait
 Douglas, 14th Duke of Hamilton and his three brothers

1903 births
1973 deaths
Alumni of Balliol College, Oxford
Chancellors of the University of St Andrews
Conservative Party (UK) hereditary peers
Deputy Lieutenants of Lanarkshire
111
114
11
Fellows of the Royal College of Surgeons of Edinburgh
Douglas Douglas-Hamilton, 14th Duke of Hamilton
Grand Crosses 1st class of the Order of Merit of the Federal Republic of Germany
Knights Grand Cross of the Royal Victorian Order
Knights of the Thistle
Lords High Commissioner to the General Assembly of the Church of Scotland
Members of the Privy Council of the United Kingdom
Douglas-Hamilton, Douglas
People educated at Eton College
Recipients of the Air Force Cross (United Kingdom)
Royal Air Force air commodores
Royal Air Force personnel of World War II
Scottish aviators
Scottish airmen
Scottish male boxers
Scottish explorers
Douglas-Hamilton, Douglas
Douglas-Hamilton, Douglas
Douglas-Hamilton, Douglas
Douglas-Hamilton, Douglas
UK MPs who inherited peerages
Fellows of the Royal Geographical Society
British aviation record holders